Zoran Drvenkar (born July 19, 1967) is a Croatian German novelist.

Biography
Born in  Križevci, Croatia, he has lived in Germany since age three.

His thriller novel Sorry won the  Friedrich-Glauser Prize in 2010.  Employing a complex multi-person narrative scheme, the English translation has been critically acclaimed. A novel for young adults, Tell Me What You See, was published in an English translation by Chantal Wright in 2005.

References

External links
 Official German Homepage Zoran Drvenkar
 The story behind You - Essay by Zoran Drvenkar at Upcoming4.me

1967 births
Living people
German male writers
Croatian emigrants to Germany